Jeff Linsky (born April 12, 1952) is an American fingerstyle guitarist who plays Latin and Brazilian jazz.

Career
Linsky was born in Whittier, California. When he was ten, he began playing guitar. During the following year, he played at a church dance and attended a concert by classical guitarist Andrés Segovia. In his teens he often went to a jazz club in Hermosa Beach, but because he was too young to enter, he remained outside to listen to the music. A solo performance by saxophonist Sonny Stitt made a strong impression on him. He took lessons from Joe Pass and Vicente Gomez. From the early 1970s to the late 1980s, he lived in Hawaii. He toured as a solo musician in the U.S. and Europe, then moved to San Francisco in 1988, and his music began to get more attention.

Discography
 Compositions (Insight 1977)
 Up Late (Concord Picante, 1988)
 Simpatico (Kamei, 1991)
 Solo (GSP 1992)
 Rendezvous (Kamei, 1992)
 Angel's Serenade (Concord Picante, 1994)
 In the Enchanted Garden with Kevin Kern (Real Music, 1996)
 California (Concord Vista, 1996)
 Passport to the Heart (Concord Vista, 1997)
 Guitarra Latina Romantica (2013)

DVD
 Fingerstyle Jazz Guitar Solos (Mel Bay, 2003)
 Latin Jazz Gutar (Mel Bay, 2008)

References

American acoustic guitarists
American male guitarists
American jazz guitarists
Fingerstyle guitarists
1952 births
Living people
20th-century American guitarists
20th-century American male musicians
American male jazz musicians